The Cammin Casket was made in southern Scandinavia around the year 1000 and decorated in the Mammen style. It held the relics of Saint Cordula. Until the Second World War, it was on display in the Cathedral of Saint John in Cammin in Western Pomerania (now Konkatedra św. Jana Chrzciciela in Kamień Pomorski in north-western Poland). The box disappeared during the war, when the church's interior was almost completely destroyed by fire. Several copies survive.

External links
Strange encounter: a dragon’s egg nestled in the Museum’s attic - blog of the Victoria and Albert museum

Shrines
Viking art